This is a list of properties and historic districts listed on the National Register of Historic Places in Sherborn, Massachusetts.

The locations of National Register properties and districts (at least for all showing latitude and longitude coordinates below) may be seen in a Google map by clicking on "Map of all coordinates".

Current listings

|}

References

 Sherborn
Sherborn
Sherborn, Massachusetts
Sherborn, Massachusetts